Ferrimicrobium acidiphilum is an extremely acidophilic and iron-oxidizing bacterium from the genus Ferrimicrobium which has been isolated from mine water from the Cae Coch sulfur mine in North Wales in England.

References

External links 
Type strain of Ferrimicrobium acidiphilum at BacDive -  the Bacterial Diversity Metadatabase

Actinomycetota
Bacteria described in 2009
Acidophiles